Zhireken is an urban locality (urban-type settlement) in Chernyshevsky District of Zabaykalsky Krai, Russia. Population:

References

Notes

Sources

Urban-type settlements in Zabaykalsky Krai